Khalifa Sheikh Qaribullah Sheikh Muhammad Nasir Kabara Al-Malikiy, Al-Ash’ariy, Al-Qadiriy (born 17th February, 1959) is the leader of the Qadriyyah Sufi Movement in Nigeria and the entire West African region. He became the Khalifa in 1996 after the death of his father, Sheikh Muhammad Nasir Kabara. With adherents stretching from Chad basin to the Senegambia, the Qadriyyah Tariqa is the most focused concentration of Sufi adherents in post-colonial Africa. Under the leadership of Khalifa Sheikh Qaribullah the Qadriyyah becomes more globalized, while retaining its local roots, using media technologies to spread the message of peace and conflict resolution through mutual dialogue, particularly among youth.Nasiru Kabara (RA).

Sheikh Qaribullah Kabara is a blood brother to Abduljabbar Nasiru Kabara.

Early life 
Khalifa Sheik Qaribullah Sheikh Muhammad Nasir Kabara was born in Kano City Northern Nigeria, on 17th February, 1959. His mother died a few minutes after his birth. The name of his stepmother is Khadija. Khadija did the best she could to make sure that he, Khalifa, not only had just a mother, but also a caring one. Khadija had been there for him, catered for him every step of the way. The House of Qadriyyah, which Khalifa Sheikh Qaribullah Sheikh Muhammad Nasir Kabara currently heads is outstanding in three respects – structured formal education in Islamic sciences, public education in Islam (Da’awah), and weekly congregational meditations.

As a child, he spent most of his life with his father, his father saw the trace of his acumen from an early age. That acumen couldn't be complete without showcasing another mark of his father's intelligence on him. His father did not leave him to enjoy some amateur early gratifications. He ensured that he accompanied him to perform Hajj when he was six years old and visited Prophet Muhammad.

as the mention went viral that he, Qaribullah, was born at Kabara district - a ground that allows children to romp, play and intermingle with their peers. Khalifa hadn’t had such an opportunity to take part in such plays and childish things. He paid more of his attention to reading Islamic writings, Qur’anic Sciences, Hadith, Jurisprudence, and other Islamic Sciences.

This, plus many other reasons, unlike other folks, had made him void of friends to unwind and, or, play. He would be spotted with friends that would only be resourceful in terms of seeking islamic knowledge.

As a teenager, he had developed the desire to be a great Arabic poet, but, simultaneously, his father had to draw him near and made him dear that he, some day, would, with every element of verbatim step in his shoes.

His upbringing was so strange among children – he would repeat everything he heard in mosques and scientific councils, and his father would correct his mistakes for him. And this is how life passed for him until he reached puberty and, surprisingly, married two women at the age of twenty-two in 1982. As uncommon, deeply unique, though lawful, as tying the knot with two women at a go – at a time, they lived considerably harmoniously together for a certain period of time before he, Sheikh Qareebullah, practiced a more genuine polygamy.

That marriage (the polygamy style), as unusual as it was, had to bear nineteen children for him.

Originally initially, Khalifa, was an ardent follower or admirer of any formation or gatherings that did have to do with the Islamic teachings. As observant as his father, a man of a watchful eye, he'd jump into conclusion of whether his son, would love pursuing religious stuff or otherwise. That situation indicated he had the urge and hunger to be connected to some moderate Islamic scholars for guidance and mentorship.

Professor Malam Abbas (the teacher of the boys), as he was locally titled, was ordered  to teach him the Qur’an, and he was from an area called Magashi ward. So, he responded to his request and came to the neighbourhood (Kabara) to teach Khalifa the Holy Qur’an. 

A seal on his hand when he was nine years old and his father rejoiced with that seal and sacrificed a bull for him to appreciate what God had bestowed upon him.

Qareebullah Sheikh Nasiru Kabara, planted and devoted himself to learning in front of his father, where he did lay his hands to study many arts, more importantly, monotheism, interpretation, hadith, jurisprudence, language and prosody. These, plus many other arts he had studied.

However, he Khalifa, did not become a seriously someone who'd be wandering in the area from one house to another seeking knowledge. He had only made for a couple of houses to interact, learn and intermingle with the scholars and those who have some kind of proximity to them. 

The two houses:

Musa Isa Ayagi's and Muallem Bashir's.

In each of these houses, he had studied “Arabic grammar" and "monotheism". 

These two amazing folks were, today, nowhere to be spotted.

Education 
Khalifa obtained his primary leaving certificate from Ma'ahad Sheikh Nasiru Gwale, a school mainly established to cater for Islamic religious activities from the year 1969-1973. Leaving primary school made him head to the secondary school, S.H.I.S. Shahuci where he obtained his higher Islamic school certificate in 1977. 

Moving to the Bayero University, Kano, had allowed him to obtain both diploma (Arabic) and a bachelor's degree (Arabic and its literature) in the years 1983 and 1994.   He, as versatile and curious as he was, never became reluctant to learning many sciences from scholars during his regular studies. 

Some of his Islamic scholars are:

 Doctor Sheikh Othman Nuraini.

 Dr. Mukhtar Atamma Bin Ahmad

 Professor Ali, Naib Suwaid of the Arabic Language Department at Bayero University (former H.O.D. Arabic department).

 Professor Muhammad Auwal Abu Bakr (formerly Head of the Arabic Language Department at Bayero University).

 Professor Mohamed Sani Hamis Darma

THE SCHOOLS HE ATTENDED INCLUDES:

 Ma’ahad Sheik Nasir Gwale​ Primary School 1973.
 S.H.I.S Shahuci Kano Higher Islamic School 1977.
 Bayero University Kano Diploma Arabic 1983.
 Bayero University Kano B.A Arabic 1994.

Honors and merit awards
 World Islamic Call Society Libya award on excellent contribution on Islamic call and scholarship 2003.
 Examplinary leadership and call award by World Islamic Call Society, 2003.
 Prime ministers hearing British House of Common, 2007
 Award of Merit (Fellow Charted Public Administrator) by Chartered Institute of Local Governments and Public Administration of Nigeria, 2010.
 Honorary Degree (Honorius Cause) Doctorate by European American University 2010.
 Honorary Degree by Oundurman Islamic University, Sudan, 2015
 Honorary Degree by Darul Salam Islamic University, Turkey, 2015

Personal life 

As a child, he spent most of his life with his father, which makes him out of peer group.  Malam Kabara II has three wives and nineteen children.

The Sheikh has also held many positions of public service within and outside Nigeria. He served as Chairman of the Kano State Pilgrims Welfare Board from 1992 to 1993 and member of the Kano State Sharia Implementation Advisory Committee from 2000 to 2003. He is the Chair of the Kano State Shura Council since 2011.

According to Sheikh  Qaribullah Kabara he possesses the hair of prophet Muhammad, which he was given by As-Sheikh Ahmadul Khazraji, a person from United Arab Emirates, from a family rumored to possess the relic for centuries.

Legacy 
He succeeded his father, and has served as the leader of West Africa for the past 25 years.

Sheikh (Dr.) Qaribullah has been a teacher, school administrator and proprietor of the Turath College of Islamic Sciences in Kano.

The government of Kano State, under the government of Abdullahi Umar Ganduje named a flyover close to Kofar Mata after his name (Sheikh Qaribullah Nasir Kabara Flyover), to honor his contribution towards Islamic religion.

CONFERENCE ATTENDED:

Sheikh Qaribullah is a recipient of many literary awards including:

 International Seminar on “The Impact of Qadiriyyah sect in the Propagation of Islam and Arabic Language in Africa” a paper presented at Bayero University Kano Organized by Arab League Educational Cultural and Scientific Organization (ALESCO) in conjunction with World Islamic Call Society 27 to 29 July 2002.
 The Fourteenth session of the international council of Islamic Call Society 20 to 23 September 2003.
 The 4th general conference, World Islamic people’s leadership 26 to 30 November 2005.
 The 7th general conference of Islamic Call, 26 to 29 November 2004.
 Seminar held during the confirmation of late Sheikh Nasir Kabara’s PhD honorary Degree at the University of Omdurman, Sudan. June 1995.
 Global warming/climate change Islamic perspective, organized by British Council, Abuja March 2010.

Maukib Qadirriya 
The Qadiriyya Sufi movement was founded in Baghdad, Iraq by Sheikh Abdul QadirJelany, a progeny of the Prophet Muhammad, about nine decades ago. The movement got worldwide recognition, particularly in the Middle East, Far East, Africa and Asia. While the spread of this movement into Hausa land and its environs in the West African sub region was as a result of the concerted eforts of the renowned Islamic reformer, Sheikh Usman Bn Fodio (1754 - 1817AD) during 18th and 19th centuries (12thth century A.H.).

The manisfestation of Sheikh Muhammad Nasiru Kabara's role as the spiritual leader of the movement came into limelight in the early fifties of the twentieth century when he went far and near in the propagation of the movment through setting up of Mosques, Islamic centres and Islamiyya schools.

His religious and educational backgrounds, personal effort and good manners were some of the ingredients and tools that supported the accomplishment of his mission.

During his times, Sheikh Muhammad Nasiru Kabara (1918- 1996) executed a number of projects in education, training. peace initiatives, and spirituality some of which were seasonal like the annual tafsir (Hausa commentary on the Holy Qur'an) at the Emir's palace, Kano, while others were on weekly and daily basis like his daily lessons and the jami'atur Rasoul classes and zikr congregation on every Friday. He took it upon himself to visit some of his disciples at different locations and prominent scholars in and outside Nigeria which earned him reputation leading to the establishment of a good rapport with the international communities.

Precisely, the year 1952 (1373A.H.) marked the beginning of the annual maukibul Qadiriyya era and gathering of Qadiriyya movement it was an event for the in depth interpretation of the biography of Sheikh AbdulQadir Jelany doctrines of the movement to be followed by procession within the streets of Kano city for final convergence at Wali Maigiginya cemetery site to be addressed by the leader of the movement. This event was initiated by late Sheikh Muhammad Nasiru Kabara in commemoration or the birth date of the founder of Qadiriyya sufi movement, Sheikh AbdulQadir Jelany. At the onset the occasion had little number of participants. but as time goes on, the number increased seriously making the occasion so attractive through drawing millions of people from most parts of the Muslim world indicating that it is one of the globally recognized religious gatherings. In 1996, Sheikh Qaribullah Sheikh Muhammad Nasiru Kabara, who took the mantle of leadership of the movement. After the death of his late father, he made colossal efforts to see to the progress and development of the movement to consolidate on his late father's initiatives and ensure scientific realizations of the Sheikh Nasiru's yearnings and aspirations. These include further propagation of the movement in different parts of the world through preaching, publications and establishment of centres. particularly a Standard Islamic Centre at the Federal Capital territory, Abuja and other two centres in Jigawa and Gombe States. All praise is due to Allah SWT for the huge success as the movement is recording a notable achievement under the good leadership style of Sheikh Qaribullah (Khalifah).

Publications 
Sheikh Qaribullah Kabara has authored more than 20 publications on Islamic jurisprudence, Sufism and Poetry. Amongst are:

 A crystal clear Mirror on Sufism. Published by Annahar Cairo 2004.
 ArrisalatulJaliyyah. Published by Arul Ann Cyprus 1998.
 Mawahibur Rahim. Published by Sharif Bala Kano 2000.
 FatuhuZuljalali. Published by Sharif Bala Kano 1999.
 Mir’atusSafiyah. Published by Annahar Cairo 2003.
 Annaqa’u was Safah. Published by SaniKurmi Kano1997.
 Shaddurrihali. Published by SaniShawishKurmi Market Kano 2002.
 DauruDariqatulQadiriyyah. Published by Annahar Cairo Egypt 2003.
 Fakkurraqabat. Published by SaniShawishKurmi Market Kano1999.
 Almiskul Addar Published by Sani Shawish Kurmi Market Kano 2009.
 Climate Change in Islam. Arabic version, Translated to English & Hausa 2010.

Family
Nasuru Kabara father.
Abduljabbar Nasuru Kabara brother.
Fatihu Qaribullah Nasiru Kabara Son.

References

External links 
 Karibullah Nasir Kabara on BBC Hausa

Hausa people
Living people
People from Kano State
Bayero University Kano alumni
Year of birth missing (living people)